Kareem (alternatively spelled Karim or Kerim) is a common given name and surname of Arabic origin that means "generous", "noble", "honorable". It is also one of the Names of God in Islam in the Quran.

Given name

Karim
 Karim Abdel Aziz, Egyptian actor
 Karim Abdul-Jabbar (later known as Abdul-Karim al-Jabbar), American football player
 Prince Karim Aga Khan, Imām of the Shia Imami Ismaili Muslims
 Karim Valiyev, Azerbaijani General
 Karim Ansarifard, Iranian football player
 Karim Azizou, Moroccan footballer
 Karim Bagheri, Iranian footballer
 Karim Bangoura, Guinean diplomat
 Karim Benounes, Algerian footballer
 Karim Benzema, French footballer
 Karim Boudiaf, Algerian-Qatari footballer
 Karim Dahou, Moroccan footballer
 Karim Djeballi, French footballer
 Karim Haggui, Tunisian footballer
 Karim Garcia, baseball player
 Karim Gazzetta (1995–2022), Swiss footballer
 Karim Haddad, Lebanese composer 
 Karim Keïta, Malian politician
 Karim Kerkar, Algerian footballer
 Karim Khan Zand, Iranian king
 Karim Kharbouch, Moroccan-American rapper whose stage name is French Montana
 Karim Khodapanahi, Iranian politician
 Karim Laribi, Italian footballer
 Karim Matmour, Algerian footballer
 Karim Maroc, Algerian footballer
 Karim Masimov, Prime Minister of Kazakhstan
 Karim Noureldin, Swiss artist
 Karim Pakradouni, Lebanese-Armenian Christian politician and government minister
 Karim Prince, American actor
 Karim Rashid, Egyptian industrial designer
 Karim Saab, Venezuelan footballer
 Karim Saidi, Tunisian footballer
 Karim Salman, Iraqi footballer
 Karim Tulaganov, Uzbek boxer
 Karim Van Overmeire, Belgian politician
 Karim Zeroual, British actor
 Karim Ziani, Algerian footballer

Kareem
 Kareem Abdul-Jabbar (born 1947), American basketball player
 Kareem Amer (born c. 1984), Egyptian blogger
 Kareem Burke (born 1974), American entrepreneur and record executive
 Kareem Campbell (born 1973), American skateboarder
 Kareem Dennis (born 1986), British rapper performing as Lowkey
 Kareem Ennab (born 1987), Jordanian swimmer
 Kareem Hunt (born 1995), American football player
 Kareem Jackson (born 1988), American football player
 Kareem Kelly (born 1981), American football player
 Kareem McKenzie (born 1979), American football player
 Kareem Moses (born 1990), Trinidadian footballer
 Kareem Orr (born 1997), American football player
 Kareem Rush (born 1980), American basketball player
 Kareem Serageldin, American banking executive convicted of fraud

Surname

Karim
 Aasif Karim, Kenyan cricketer
 Afsir Karim, Indian Army general and military scholar
 Bavand Karim, Iranian-American filmmaker
 Jawed Karim, co-founder of YouTube
 Mahmoud Karim, Egyptian squash player
 Manzoor Ul Karim, Chief National Commissioner of the Bangladesh Scouts and government official
 Mohammed Karim, Egyptian film director
 Mosharraf Karim, Bangladeshi actor
 Mona Karim, Lebanese actress
 Musharraf Karim, Bangladeshi writer
 Persis Karim, American poet, editor, educator
 Rashid Karim, Bangladeshi novelist
 Saba Karim, Indian cricketer
 Sajjad Karim, British Member of the European Parliament

Kareem
 Khalid Kareem (born 1998), American football player
 Yaqub Kareem, Nigerian boxer

Fictional characters
 Karim family in the BBC soap opera EastEnders
 Kareem Said, a Muslim prisoner in the TV series Oz
 Kareem, played by Rodney Sinclair in the British web series Corner Shop Show
 Karim, in the video game Eternal Darkness: Sanity's Requiem
 Karim Bouchtat, a recurring character in the Channel 4 series My Mad Fat Diary
 Kareem (Marvel Cinematic Universe), in the Disney+ series Ms. Marvel

See also

 Karie (name)
 Abdul Karim (disambiguation), Arabic theophoric name
 Karimov, Russianized surname
 Kerimov, Russianized surname

Arabic-language surnames
Arabic masculine given names
Bosniak masculine given names
Names of God in Islam
Bengali Muslim surnames